Neil Robert Sproston (born 20 November 1970) is an English former professional footballer who played in the Football League for Birmingham City.

Sproston was born in Dudley, West Midlands. When he left school in 1986, he joined Birmingham City as a YTS trainee, and turned professional two years later. With fellow forwards Tony Rees, Andy Kennedy and Steve Whitton unavailable, Sproston, still a trainee, was given a place on the substitutes' bench for the Second Division game at home to Middlesbrough on 24 October 1987, four weeks before his 17th birthday. He came into the game as the second substitute used, to replace John Trewick, and marked his debut by receiving a head wound which needed stitches. At the time he was the second-youngest player (behind Trevor Francis) to appear for Birmingham's first team. In the youth team Sproston was tried in a variety of positions, ending up playing in midfield, but never played for the first team again. Released at the end of the 1989–90 season, he went on to play for a number of non-league teams in the West Midlands area.

References

1970 births
Living people
Sportspeople from Dudley
English footballers
Association football forwards
Birmingham City F.C. players
Alvechurch F.C. players
Armitage 90 F.C. players
Brierley Hill & Withymoor F.C. players
Dudley Town F.C. players
Lye Town F.C. players
English Football League players